Tantalum(V) chloride, also known as tantalum pentachloride, is an inorganic compound with the formula TaCl5. It takes the form of a white powder and is commonly used as a starting material in tantalum chemistry. It readily hydrolyzes to form tantalum(V) oxychloride (TaOCl3) and eventually tantalum pentoxide (Ta2O5); this requires that it be synthesised and manipulated under anhydrous conditions, using air-free techniques.

Structure
TaCl5 crystallizes in the monoclinic space group C2/m.  The ten chlorine atoms define a pair of octahedra that share a common edge. The tantalum atoms occupy the centres of the octahedra and are joined by two chlorine bridging ligands.  The dimeric structure is retained in non-complexing solvents and to a large extent in the molten state.  In the vapour state, however, TaCl5 is monomeric.  This monomer adopts a trigonal bipyramidal structure, like that of PCl5.

Physical Properties
The solubility of tantalum pentachloride increases slightly for the following series of aromatic hydrocarbons: 

 benzene < toluene < m-xylene < mesitylene

This is reflected in the deepening of colour of the solutions from pale yellow to orange.  Tantalum pentachloride is less soluble in cyclohexane and carbon tetrachloride than in the aromatic hydrocarbons.  Such solutions of tantalum pentachloride are also known to be poor conductors of electricity, indicating little ionization.  TaCl5 is purified by sublimation to give white needles.

Synthesis
Tantalum pentachloride can be prepared by reacting powdered metallic tantalum with chlorine gas at between 170 and 250 °C. This reaction can also be performed using HCl at 400 °C.

 2 Ta + 5 Cl2 → 2 TaCl5
 2 Ta + 10 HCl → 2 TaCl5 + 5 H2

It can also be prepared by a reaction between tantalum pentoxide and thionyl chloride at 240 °C

 Ta2O5 + 5 SOCl2 → 2 TaCl5 + 5 SO2

Tantalum pentachloride is commercially available, however samples can be contaminated with tantalum(V) oxychloride (TaOCl3), formed by hydrolysis.

Reactions
TaCl5 is electrophilic and it behaves like a Friedel–Crafts catalyst, similar to  AlCl3.  It forms adducts with  a variety of Lewis bases.

Simple adducts
TaCl5 forms stable complexes with ethers:
TaCl5 + R2O  →  TaCl5(OR2)  (R = Me, Et)

TaCl5 also reacts with phosphorus pentachloride and phosphorus oxychloride, the former as a chloride donor and the latter serves as a ligand, binding through the oxygen:
TaCl5  +  PCl5  →  [][]
TaCl5  +  OPCl3  →  [TaCl5(OPCl3)]

Tantalum pentachloride reacts with tertiary amines to give crystalline adducts.
TaCl5 + 2 R3N → [TaCl5(NR3)]

Chloride displacement reactions
Tantalum pentachloride reacts at room temperature with an excess of triphenylphosphine oxide to give oxychlorides:
TaCl5 + 3 OPPh3 → [TaOCl3(OPPh3)]x ...

The presumed initial formation of adducts between TaCl5 and hydroxyl compounds such as alcohols, phenols and carboxylic acids is followed immediately by the elimination of hydrogen chloride and the formation of Ta–O bonds:
TaCl5 + 3 HOEt → TaCl2(OEt)3  +  3 HCl
In the presence of ammonia as a HCl acceptor, all five chloride ligands are displaced with formation of Ta(OEt)5.  Similarly TaCl5 reacts with lithium methoxide in anhydrous methanol to form related methoxy derivatives:
TaCl5 + 4 LiOMe → Ta(OMe)4Cl + 4 LiCl

Ammonolysis and alcoholysis and related reactions
Ammonia will displace most of the chloride ligands from TaCl5 to give a cluster.  Chloride is displaced more slowly by primary or secondary amines but the replacement of all five chloride centers by amido groups has been achieved by the use of lithium dialkylamides, as illustrated by the synthesis of pentakis(dimethylamido)tantalum:
TaCl5 + 5 LiNMe2  →  Ta(NMe2)5

With alcohols, the pentachloride reacts to give alkoxides.  As shown for the preparation of tantalum(V) ethoxide, such reactions are often conducted in the presence of base:
10 EtOH + Ta2Cl10 + 10 NH3 → Ta2(OEt)10 + 10 NH4Cl

Tantalum pentachloride is reduced by nitrogen heterocycles such as pyridine.

Reduction
Reduction of tantalum(V) chloride gives anionic and neutral clusters including [Ta6Cl18]4− and [Ta6Cl14](H2O)4.

References

Further reading

External links

NIST Standard Reference Database

Tantalum compounds
Chlorides
Metal halides